Wellington Regional Council, branded as Greater Wellington Regional Council, is the regional council overseeing the Wellington Region of New Zealand's lower North Island. It is responsible for public transport under the brand Metlink, environmental and flood protection, and the region's water supply.

The Wellington Regional Council was first formed in 1980 from the amalgamation of the functions of the Wellington Regional Planning Authority with those of the Wellington Regional Water Board, before taking its current form with the local government reforms of 1989.

A proposal made in 2013 that nine territorial authorities amalgamate to form a single supercity met substantial local opposition and was abandoned in June 2015.

Council members 

The governing body of the regional council is made up of 13 councillors, representing six constituencies:
 Pōneke/Wellington – 5 councillors
 Kāpiti Coast – 1
 Porirua-Tawa – 2
 Te Awa Kairangi ki Tai/Lower Hutt – 3
 Te Awa Kairangi ki Uta/Upper Hutt – 1
 Wairarapa – 1

As of the 2022 local elections the regional councillors are:

Chairs

Regional parks

The council administers several regional parks.

 Akatarawa Forest
 Baring Head/Orua-pouanui
 Battle Hill Farm Forest Park
 Belmont Regional Park
 East Harbour Regional Park
 Hutt River Trail
 Hutt Water Collection Area
 Kaitoke Regional Park
 Pakuratahi Forest
 Queen Elizabeth Park
 Te Awarua-o-Porirua Harbour
 Wainuiomata Recreation Area
 Wainuiomata Water Collection Area
 Wairarapa Moana Wetlands
 Wellington Harbour
 Whitireia Park

See also
Manawatū-Whanganui Regional council - neighbouring regional council
Territorial authorities within the Greater Wellington region:
Wellington City Council
Porirua City Council
Hutt City Council
Upper Hutt City Council
Kapiti Coast District Council
South Wairarapa District Council
Carterton District Council
Masterton District Council

References

Politics of the Wellington Region